Mohamed Yunus al-Menfi (born 3 March 1976) is a Libyan diplomat and politician from Tobruk. 

On 5 February 2021, he was chosen as the president of the Libyan Presidential Council at the Libyan Political Dialogue Forum. Previously, he had served as the Libyan Ambassador to Greece.

Ambassadorship
Al-Menfi's period as ambassador in Athens was marked by a tense relationship between the GNA and the Greek government because of the Libyan (GNA)–Turkish accord on maritime boundaries. He was eventually expelled from Athens in December 2019.

Presidency of Presidential Council
In the Libyan Political Dialogue Forum procedure for choosing a unified executive authority to lead into the 24 December 2021 Libyan general election, Al-Menfi ran on a joint ticket with Abdul Hamid Dbeibeh as prime minister and Musa Al-Koni and Abdullah al-Lafi as members of the Presidential Council. Their list obtained 39 votes, five more than that of Aguila Saleh Issa and Fathi Bashagha. The Aguila Saleh–Bashagha list was perceived to be favoured by the United States. The U.S. ambassador denied any attempt to influence the electoral process.

References

1976 births
Libyan politicians
Living people
Libyan Muslims
Heads of state of Libya
Ambassadors of Libya to Greece
Members of the Presidential Council (Libya)
People from Tobruk